The Azerbaijan men's national volleyball team represents Azerbaijan in international men's volleyball competitions and friendly matches.

European League

Islamic Solidarity Games

External links
Official website
FIVB profile

National men's volleyball teams
Volleyball men
Volleyball in Azerbaijan
Men's sport in Azerbaijan